Frondipedia is a monotypic genus of beetle in the family Cerambycidae containing the single species Frondipedia charma. It was described by Martins and Napp in 1984.  The species is native to Brazil.

References 

Cerambycinae
Beetles described in 1984
Monotypic Cerambycidae genera